The 2009 Svenska Cupen Final took place on November 7, 2009 at Råsunda Stadium in Solna. The match was contested between recently crowned Allsvenskan champions AIK and Allsvenskan runners-up IFK Göteborg, The two teams actually met in the last and crucial league match of the season, just six days before the cup final, where AIK won 2-1 and became league champions.

This cup final was also won by AIK after two second half goals by Iván Obolo and Antônio Flávio. Thanks to the win, AIK secured a Double for the first time in their history. IFK Göteborg played their third cup final in a row and their fourth in the 2000s.

Road to the Final

 Square brackets [ ] represent the opposition's division.

Match details

See also
2009 Svenska Cupen

References

External links
Svenska Cupen at svenskfotboll.se

2009
Cupen
AIK Fotboll matches
IFK Göteborg matches
Football in Stockholm
November 2009 sports events in Europe